The Wightman Cup was an annual team tennis competition for women contested from 1923 through 1989 (except during World War II) between teams from the United States and Great Britain.

History
U.S. player Hazel Hotchkiss Wightman wanted to generate international interest in women's tennis the way Davis Cup did for men's. In 1920, she donated a sterling silver vase to the United States Lawn Tennis Association (USLTA) as a prize for an international team competition. Initial efforts to involve teams from all over the world, and in particular France with Suzanne Lenglen, proved unsuccessful due to financial constraints. 

The USLTA decided to invite Great Britain to challenge for the prize. Each match consisted of seven 'rubbers': five singles rubbers and two doubles. The top two players from each team would face each other in singles, with the matches then reversed. A third singles player from each team would play each other once. Two doubles teams would compete, but no player could play more than one doubles match. The cup always ended with the doubles match played between the two top pairs from each team.

The inaugural competition was played on 11 and 13 August 1923 in the newly constructed stadium at the West Side Tennis Club in Forest Hills, New York. The matches were played in even years in Britain and in odd years in the U.S. The U.S. matches were played at the West Side Tennis Club in Forest Hills, New York from the first year, 1923, through 1947, and the British matches were played at Wimbledon from the first year, 1924, through 1972.

The competition was a two-day event until 1967 when the U.S. event was held over three days in order to generate more revenue. A record 16,000 spectators attended that year. Until 1960, all editions of the Wightman Cup were played on grass courts: in later years also clay courts, cement and synthetic carpet were used. In 1978, the competition moved indoors to the Royal Albert Hall, was sponsored for the first time, and was called the Carnation Wightman Cup.

The BBC provided broadcast coverage of the competition from 1936 until 1987, although the final broadcast was limited to BBC Radio; the last televised competition in the UK was 1986. 

The competition was continued through 1989, with the USTA and the Lawn Tennis Association jointly announcing on February 20, 1990 that the competition would be suspended indefinitely, citing low interest following years of American domination.

Results
Total wins:  51–10

See also
 Billie Jean King Cup

References

External links
British Pathé – Newsreels Wightman Cup

 
Tennis tournaments in England
Tennis tournaments in Wales
Tennis tournaments in the United States
Recurring sporting events established in 1923
Recurring sporting events disestablished in 1990
International tennis competitions